The obsolete Finnish units of measurement consist mostly of a variety of units traditionally used in Finland that are similar to those that were traditionally used in other countries and are still used in the United Kingdom (imperial units) and the United States (United States customary units).

Very few of these units are sometimes still used in everyday speech and even when buying and measuring things as shorthand for similar amounts in the metric system. For example, kappa (sometimes called isokappa) is still used at markets to measure exactly five liters of potatoes. When ordering firewood, some customers (and even dealers) use syli to refer to a cubic meter, but some old people use the term to refer to various much larger amounts of firewood.

Most Finnish obsolete units of measurement were identical to Swedish units of measurement, including units of length being based on the Swedish "foot" (29.69 cm) that was defined in 1605, since Finland was part of Sweden from the Middle Ages to 1809, but later some Russian units were also used.

The measurements were first standardized by law in 1665 and were revised in 1735. Before this, measurements often varied between towns. The king's bailiff in the town of Porvoo, for example, used two sets of measures: a big one for collecting tax in kind from the populace and a smaller set to remit the assets to the king, keeping the difference for himself. However, nowadays the proverb mitata Porvoon mitalla (to measure in Porvoo units) has a positive meaning of measuring in excess or generously.

Certain units were standardized to the metric system in 1861, and Finland fully converted to the metric system in 1880.

Length

Maritime units

meripeninkulma – 1,852 m. Same as nautical mile. One angular minute at equator.
kaapelinmitta – 185.2 m.  of a nautical mile.
syli – 1.852 m.  of a nautical mile. Used for measuring depth.
solmu – nautical miles per hour. Same as knot. Speed unit.

Obsolete:

merisekunti* – 30.8666 m.  of nautical mile
meritertia* – 0.51444 m.  of nautical mile

Area

Volume

Dry measure

Liquid measure

Mass

Miscellaneous 

 askel (pace) – Roughly one meter for an adult male—a rough but convenient way to measure distances while walking.
 hehto – hectoliter, 100 liters, potatoes
 kivenheitto (Throw of a rock) – 100 kyynärä (approx 60 m), today used to describe something to be very near (from Swedish stenkast also literally meaning "throw of a stone/rock")
 poronkusema – (approximately 7.5 km). A Sami measurement of distance; the distance a reindeer can travel before needing to stop to urinate. Today used to describe something that is at a very obscure distance away.
 Poronkusemaa kuukaudessa – (poronkusemas per month) similar to furlongs per fortnight, about 2.9 mm/s
 tusina – 12 (from Swedish "dussin" = dozen)
 toltti – 12 (lumber)
 tiu – 20 (eggs) (from Swedish tjog, previously used for 20 of anything, not only eggs)
 puntti – 20 (matchboxes)
 kerpo – 31 (lampreys; 30 as a bunch and one for tying)
 krossi – 144 (items) (from Swedish gross = 12 dozens; originally from French douzaine grosse meaning "large dozen")
 kiihtelys – 40 (squirrel pelts)
 riisi – 500 (paper sheets) (from Swedish ris, with the same meaning)
 tonni – 1,000 (usually refers to 1,000 kg, but can refer also anything of 1,000, especially money)
 motti – 1 m3 (firewood or waste paper), also 1 dm3 in "motin pullo", a 1-litre bottle, usually of alcohol

See also 
 Historical weights and measures
 List of obsolete units of measurement
 Petrograd Standard
 International System of Units
 Weights and measures

References

External links
 Scandinavian units

Systems of units
Science and technology in Finland
Finnish obsolete units of measurement
Finnish obsolete units of measurement